Tomáš Došek (born 12 September 1978 in Karlovy Vary) is a former Czech football player who last played for FC Zbrojovka Brno. His twin brother Lukáš plays for FC Thun in the Swiss Super League. They played together at SK Slavia Praha from 1999 to 2004 and also at the international level for the Czech Republic under-21 team and the full national team.

In 1998, he won the Talent of the Year award at the Czech Footballer of the Year awards.

References

External links
 
 1. FC Brno profile 
 
 

1978 births
Living people
Czech footballers
Czech Republic youth international footballers
Czech Republic under-21 international footballers
Czech Republic international footballers
Czech First League players
SK Slavia Prague players
FC Viktoria Plzeň players
Wisła Płock players
FC Zbrojovka Brno players
SK Rapid Wien players
Austrian Football Bundesliga players
Ekstraklasa players
Sportspeople from Karlovy Vary
Expatriate footballers in Poland
Czech expatriate sportspeople in Poland
Czech twins
Twin sportspeople
Association football forwards